The Halo Effect is a Swedish melodic death metal band formed by former members of In Flames. They are signed to the Nuclear Blast label.

History
The Halo Effect was founded by five former members of the Swedish metal band In Flames. Jesper Strömblad was a founding member of In Flames in 1990, and in 1993 Mikael Stanne (who founded the band Dark Tranquillity and remains its sole founding member today) worked as a session vocalist on In Flames' demo tape and debut album. Niclas Engelin and Peter Iwers joined In Flames in 1997, and Daniel Svensson joined In Flames in 1998 after Niclas Engelin quit. Subsequently, Strömblad, Iwers, and Svensson played together in In Flames for over 10 years by the time Strömblad quit that band in 2010.

The Halo Effect coalesced in 2020 during the COVID-19 pandemic, and according to press releases, the motivating idea behind the band was to return to the roots of the 1990s "Gothenburg sound" that pioneered the melodic death metal genre. According to an interview on Robb Flynn's No F'n Regrets podcast, the band's name comes from the song off Rush's album Clockwork Angels.

The band released their debut single, "Shadowminds" on 9 November 2021 ahead of their debut album, Days of the Lost, released on 12 August, 2022.  To support the album, the band toured Europe and the UK with Amon Amarth and Machine Head in September and October.

Members
Current members
 Niclas Engelin – lead guitar (2021–present)
 Peter Iwers – bass guitar (2021–present)
 Mikael Stanne – lead vocals (2021–present)
 Jesper Strömblad – rhythm guitar (2021–present)
 Daniel Svensson – drums (2021–present)

Current live members
Patrik Jensen – rhythm guitar (2022–present)

Discography

Studio albums
 Days of the Lost (2022) – No. 1 Sweden, No. 6 Finland

Singles
 "Shadowminds" (2021)
 "Feel What I Believe" (2022)
 "Days of the Lost" (2022)
 "The Needless End" (2022)

Reference

External links
 

Swedish heavy metal musical groups
2021 establishments in Sweden
Nuclear Blast artists
Swedish melodic death metal musical groups
Musical quintets